Qian Zhengying (4 July 1923 – 22 October 2022) was a Chinese hydrologist and politician.

Biography
She was born in Jiaxing, Zhejiang Province. Her father trained as an engineer in the United States before returning to China; some sources report that Qian was born in the United States. She trained as a civil engineer at Utopia University. Qian joined the Communist Party of China in 1941. She worked with the Red Army in northern China and was involved in projects on the Huai and Yellow Rivers. In 1949, she was vice-director of the Water Conservancy Department of the East China Political and Military Commission and Vice-Director of the Project Department for the Huaihe River Commission. From 1950 to 1952, she was president of East China Technical University of Water Resources (now Hohai University).

She was a member of the 10th, 11th, 12th, 13th and 14th Central Committees of the Communist Party of China (CPC). Qian was also vice-minister and then Minister of Water Resources. She served as Vice Chairperson of the Chinese People's Political Consultative Conference for the 7th, 8th and 9th national committees. In 1994, she was elected the sixth president of the Red Cross Society of China. In 1997, she was elected academician of the Chinese Academy of Engineering and, in 1998, received the Technology Engineering of China prize.

References

External links 
 

1923 births
2022 deaths
Chinese hydrologists
Chinese Communist Party politicians from Zhejiang
21st-century Chinese women scientists
State councillors of China
20th-century Chinese women scientists
20th-century Chinese women politicians
Politicians from Jiaxing
People's Republic of China politicians from Zhejiang
Engineers from Zhejiang
Utopia University alumni
Members of the Chinese Academy of Engineering
Academic staff of Hohai University
Educators from Jiaxing
Vice Chairpersons of the National Committee of the Chinese People's Political Consultative Conference
Ministers of Water Resources of the People's Republic of China
Women government ministers of China